Paros is an impact crater on Mars.  It lies south of Ceraunius Tholus.

It was named by the IAU in 1988 after the ancient Greek city of Paros.

Paros is a complex crater that used to have a mountainous central peak.  The peak has been destroyed by an impact and only remnants of the peak protrude above the surface.

A rille extends from the southern rim of Paros to the southwest across the ejecta blanket of the crater and beyond it, towards a shorter, more subdued rille on the older surface.

References 

Impact craters on Mars